Disney/Little Blue State Park is a  Oklahoma state park located near Disney, Oklahoma in the eastern part of the state. The park is a popular site for bass fishing and water sports.

Geography
The park is located in Mayes County along state highway 28.

References

External links
Disney/Little Blue State Park

State parks of Oklahoma
Protected areas of Mayes County, Oklahoma